Lehman Kahn (September 9, 1827 – February 4, 1915), also known by the pseudonym L. K. Amitaï, was a Belgian Jewish educationist and writer.

Biography
Lehman Kahn was born in Breisach, Baden, to Jewish parents Sara and David Kahn. He was educated at the Progymnasium of Breisach and at the polytechnic school and the pedagogic seminary of Carlsruhe.

After occupying the position of teacher in his native country and at the Jewish school of Hegenheim, Alsace, Kahn was called to Brussels as principal of the Jewish school there (1855). He also taught singing and conducted the choir at the city's synagogue services. In October, 1863, he founded L'Institut International Kahn, a school of commerce and modern languages.

Under the pseudonym L. K. Amitaï, he published essays on intermarriage, assimilation, antisemitism, and other topics of concern to the Jewish community.

Publications

 
  Translated into Dutch, English, and German.
  Two pamphlets against the plan of the Brussels city administration to close the Jewish cemeteries.
  Awarded a prize by the Academy of Sciences of Brussels.
  Two pamphlets.

References
 

1827 births
1915 deaths
Belgian Jews
19th-century Belgian educators
Jewish writers
People from Breisach
School founders
Jewish educators